Cordia trichotoma, or louro pardo, is a species of a medium-sized deciduous tree that belongs to the family Boraginaceae. It is a perennial native to tropical forests and humid temperatures in Brazil, Bolivia, Argentina and others.

Description
The tree is known for being approximately 20-30 m tall, with trunk diameters of 70–90 cm. Their flowers are white, with 5 petals each with an oval shape. Their leaves are broad, simple and the fruit is a drupe. In Brazil, the tree is primarily found in the wilderness of the Amazonas.

Cultivation 
Cordia trichotoma is a pioneer species, primarily used and sold for high caliber furniture across the world because of its great wood quality and trunk form. The tailing business mostly led by the Brazilian makes the deciduous tree hard to come by, due to the difficulty of its seed propagation. Many of its natural resources are being threatened by environmental and human conditions.

References

 Morphological, physiological and biochemical traits of Cordia trichotoma under phosphorous application and a water-retaining polymer
 Cordia Trichotoma

External links

trichotoma